Eugene Glynn is the name of:

 Gene Glynn (born 1956), American professional baseball coach and former minor league manager and second baseman.
 Eugene David Glynn (doctor) (1926–2007), psychoanalyst and partner of Maurice Sendak, the American illustrator and children's book writer